Laois may refer to:
County Laois, Ireland; formerly called Queen's County, Leix, Laoighis
Laois (Dáil constituency)
Queen's County (Parliament of Ireland constituency) 
Queen's County (UK Parliament constituency)
Queen's County Ossory (UK Parliament constituency)
Queen's County Leix (UK Parliament constituency)
Laois GAA
Loígis, medieval Irish kingdom

See also
Laos, country in Southeast Asia